The Refreshments were an alternative rock band from Tempe, Arizona. The band is best known for the single "Banditos" from their 1996 breakthrough album Fizzy Fuzzy Big & Buzzy, and also for "Yahoos and Triangles", the theme song to the long-running animated series King of the Hill. The latter was a piece the band traditionally performed at soundchecks. The Refreshments disbanded in 1998, although Roger Clyne and P.H. Naffah continue to tour and play Refreshments songs along with new music as Roger Clyne and the Peacemakers.

History

Background
Originally The Mortals in 1992, Roger Clyne and Dustin "Dusty" Denham wanted to continue playing after that band's tenure had come to an end. They formed The Refreshments in early 1993 and had considered names like "Pop Enema" and "All You Can Eat" before settling on a more conventional name. The original lineup consisted of Clyne (lead vocals, rhythm guitar, harmonica, kazoo), Brian David Blush (lead guitar, backing vocals), Art Edwards (bass guitar, backing vocals), and Denham (drums, percussion, backing vocals). Blush came from a band called August Red, who were active around 1991 and consisted of Tim Thiel, Brian Spector, Brian Blush, Larkin Decker, and Michael Gatt.  Denham and Edwards had played together for a short time in a band called The Hanson Brothers.

In one year the band went from opening for such powerhouse local bands as Dead Hot Workshop and the Gin Blossoms to headlining and packing venues five nights a week. The Refreshments applied for entry to South by Southwest in Austin, Texas, and were not only received, but learned that the band's demo tape had been played for an A&R rep for Mercury Records; as a result of their performance at the music festival, the band was signed by the label as well as signing with manager, Michael Lustig. In 1995, original drummer Dustin "Dusty" Denham departed, and was replaced by Paul "P.H." Naffah who had played in a local band called Rain Convention.

The Refreshments recorded their first record in the summer of 1995 and it was released in January 1996. The band hit the number one spot on Billboard's Heatseekers list with the single "Banditos" and toured throughout the U.S. “Banditos” peaked at No. 9 on the Billboard Alternative Rock charts and crossed over into the Hot 100. The band was slated to leave for Australian tour in the late fall but it was canceled by the new president of Mercury Records and the band members were told to go record their second album. Their second album was recorded in early 1997 and it was released in the fall of 1997. There was no financial or promotional support from Mercury to promote a tour. Mercury Records let the band's recording contract lapse in early 1998, unimpressed by the flagging sales of its second CD, The Bottle & Fresh Horses. The Refreshments decided that the writing was on the wall and left Mercury before they were dropped from the label's lineup. The band sold 10,000 units in December 1997, their last month with the label.

The second Refreshments album, 1997's The Bottle and Fresh Horses, spent one week on the chart. The band lost its deal with Mercury around the time Blush's drug problem peaked. In 1998, the band could no longer tolerate his substance use, and Blush was removed from the band. Blush pawned his publishing rights for both “King of the Hill” and the Refreshments catalog for $2,500.

Roger Clyne and P.H. Naffah decided to rename the band and to continue touring and making music; the band still plays today as Roger Clyne and the Peacemakers.

The group was known for its "Southwestern Sound," similar to other bands hailing from Arizona such as The Sidewinders, Gin Blossoms, The Meat Puppets and Dead Hot Workshop. The group had two charting singles, both from 1996's Fizzy Fuzzy Big & Buzzy (both written by Roger Clyne): "Banditos" (U.S. Mainstream Rock No. 11, Modern Rock No. 14), and "Down Together" (Modern Rock No. 38).

Current
Lead vocalist, rhythm guitarist, and primary songwriter Roger Clyne and drummer Paul "P.H." Naffah renamed the group Roger Clyne & The Peacemakers in 1998, and still perform most of The Refreshments songs live in concert. Clyne is known to occasionally play acoustic shows, with or without Naffah. Roger Clyne & The Peacemakers have released 8 studio albums, 2 live albums and a live DVD of their annual music festival, Circus Mexicus, in Puerto Peñasco, Mexico. They also went on to form a close relationship with the Major League Baseball team the Arizona Diamondbacks, writing/performing the team's theme song, "The D-Back's Swing". The band has also performed concerts for the team after ballgames at Chase Field and other various team events.

Art Edwards is now a writer, and self-published his novels, Stuck Outside of Phoenix  and Ghost Notes with another, Badge, released in early 2014.
Stuck Outside of Phoenix was made into a full-length feature film which premiered May 2, 2013. It was produced by Nico Holthaus and directed by Dean Mongan, and stars Brandon Hannifin.

Guitarist Brian David Blush is now a member of The Toluenes.  The band’s first album with Blush was tentatively scheduled for release in February 2011. Blush performed onstage with Roger Clyne and the Peacemakers on July 27, 2010 at Mr. G’s in Osceola, Indiana with Clyne, Naffah, and bassist Nick Scropos, performing "Nada". This was his first performance with them since 1998.

In March 2013, Roger, PH & Brian re-united and performed as The Refreshments to a raucous crowd at the Circus Mexicus Music Festival in June 2013.  Once again, Roger, PH & Brian played at Circus Mexicus in 2016, to celebrate the 20th anniversary of Fizzy Fuzzy Big & Buzzy.

In 2017, the documentary film titled Here's To Life – The Story of the Refreshments was released on Digital/DVD/Blu-Ray. The film chronicles the groups beginnings as a bar band, their rise to fame on a major label and issues within the band and the music industry that led to their sudden end.

Band members

Former members
 Roger Clyne – lead vocals, rhythm guitar, harmonica, kazoo (1992–1998, 2010, 2013, 2016)
 Dusty Denham – drums, percussion, backing vocals (1992–1995)
 Paul "P.H." Naffah – drums, percussion, backing vocals (1992, 1995–1998, 2010, 2013, 2016)
 Arthur Eugene "Buddy" Edwards – bass guitar, backing vocals, keyboards (1993–1998, 2013)
 Brian David Blush – lead guitar, backing vocals (1993–1998, 2010, 2013, 2016)

Touring guests
 Nick Scropos – bass guitar, backing vocals (2010, 2013, 2016)

Discography

Studio albums
 Fizzy Fuzzy Big & Buzzy (Mercury Records, 1996)
 The Bottle & Fresh Horses (Mercury Records, 1997)

Independent albums
 Wheelie (self-released, 1994)

EPs
 Lo, Our Much Praised Yet Not Altogether Satisfactory Lady (1995)

Demos
 Seattle Demos (1994)

Singles

References

External links
 The Official Unofficial Refreshments Page
 Roger Clyne and the Peacemakers
 Art Edwards
 U: The National College Magazine Interview, 1996

Alternative rock groups from Arizona
Jangle pop groups
Musical groups from Tempe, Arizona
Musical groups established in 1992
Musical groups disestablished in 1998
King of the Hill